Tunnelen, also released under the English title The Tunnel, is a 2016 Norwegian short science fiction film written and directed by André Øvredal, based on a short story by Alice Glaser. It should not be confused with the 2019 full length Norwegian film with the same title.

Plot
A family returning home from a swim are caught in slow-moving traffic among a sea of identical black hearselike self-driving cars along a multilane highway leading to a tunnel. At times the tunnel must be closed, forcing all vehicles to shut down and giving people time to stand outside. Peter befriends a girl named Eva from a car in the next lane. As they approach the tunnel, it becomes apparent that it is used as a means of population reduction. While passing through it, they are concerned that they will be caught in it during the next closure. A car from another lane decides to change lanes within the tunnel, delaying the family's progress. They make it out of the tunnel just before its next closure. Peter looks around but cannot find Eva's car.

Cast
 Siri Helene Müller as Jeanette
 Kyrre Haugen Sydness as Tom
 Max Admundsen as Peter
 Maria Dingsøyr-Henriksen as Anne
 Gio Fonseca as Luka
 Ella Glenton Schjerven as Eva

Release
The short film premiered at the Tribeca Film Festival on 16 April 2016. It was later included as a special feature on the home video release of The Autopsy of Jane Doe.

Awards
The short film won the Méliès d'Argent at the 2016 Strasbourg European Fantastic Film Festival.

Reception
In a positive review for Deluxe Video Online, Neil Worcester wrote: "From the opening credits, I was thrilled with The Tunnel."

Analysis
In an interview with Rue Morgue about the production of The Long Walk, Øvredal noted: "I did a short film called The Tunnel that premiered at the Tribeca Film Festival three years ago, and it's a very similar story. When I read the script, which is so close to the book—it really honors what King wrote in a beautiful way—I felt like I had told the story, but in a different way, which connected to the idea of being on a journey you cannot stop. It's an unstoppable journey, and the only way out is death, really."

References

External links
 

2016 short films
2010s science fiction films
Films about death
Films about road transport
Films directed by André Øvredal
Films set in the future
Films based on science fiction short stories
Norwegian-language films
Norwegian science fiction films
Norwegian short films
Overpopulation fiction
Science fiction short films
2010s English-language films